1800Mattress.com (formerly known as 1-800-Mattress, Dial-A-Mattress and Dial-A-Mattress Operating Corps) was an American bedding retailer headquartered in Hicksville, New York and famous for its ads that used the slogan "leave off the last S for savings" (since the word "mattress" has 8 letters and only 7 are necessary for the phoneword).

History
1800mattress.com was founded as Dial-A-Mattress in 1976 by furniture store employee Napoleon Barragan. His idea for the business was inspired by an advertisement for Dial-A-Steak, a business that sold meat over the telephone.
 From its beginnings as a basement operation, 1979 saw the first Dial-A-Mattress ads on television and in October 1988, Dial-A-Mattress started promoting their toll-free 800 number in broadcast ads. Having quickly eclipsed the furniture store where Barragan originally worked,  the company went national in 1994 and later the name was changed to 1-800-Mattress corresponding with the familiar "1-800-Mattress" jingle written by Andy Vallario, the President and chief creative officer of Media Results, Inc. Part of the company's growth was spurred by referrals and a familiarity with the brand, largely due to the catchy jingle and brand awareness.

In 2005, near the company's peak when it was the leading bedding telemarketing company in the US, 1800mattress had more than 300 employees with annual sales in excess of $100 million. It had nearly 50 showrooms and 250 distributors nationwide. On March 23, 2009, 1-800-Mattress filed for Chapter 11 bankruptcy protection pending a proposed merger with former rival, Sleepy's and later that year the merger was completed and 1-800-Mattress officially became 1800Mattress.com. In 2015, Sleepy's was acquired from Mattress Firm for $780 million; Sleepy's retail stores became Mattress Firm, and 1800Mattress.com remained in use. In  2019, Mattress Firm appointed John Eck as its new CEO.

As of 2021, the 1800Mattress.com brand was retired and the website now redirects to Mattress Firm.

See also 
 Dial-A-Mattress Franchise Corp. v. Anthony Page

References

External links
1800mattress.com

Mattress retailers of the United States
800-Mattress
Direct sales companies
American companies established in 1976
Retail companies established in 1976
Retail companies disestablished in 2021
1976 establishments in New York (state)